Miami City Hall is the local government headquarters for the City of Miami, Florida. It has been located in the former Pan American Airlines Terminal Building on Dinner Key, which was designed by Delano & Aldrich and constructed in 1934 for the former International Pan American Airport, since 1954. The city's government headquarters originated in Downtown Miami for 58 years until its relocation to Coconut Grove.

History
An early city hall located in downtown on Flagler Street (formerly "Twelfth Street") just southeast of the Florida East Coast Railroad Miami depot and designed by Walter De Garmo was in use from 1907 until 1928. Miami's city hall was then relocated one block north, and housed in the newly constructed Dade County Courthouse from 1928 until it was moved to its current Coconut Grove location in 1954.

The terminal building was added to the U.S. National Register of Historic Places on February 20, 1975.

Pan Am's final flight to Dinner Key took place August 9, 1945 as seaplane use decreased with the construction of landing fields (airports) in Latin America.

Gallery

See also
 Government of Miami
 List of mayors of Miami
 Coast Guard Air Station Dinner Key

References

National Register of Historic Places in Miami
Government buildings completed in 1931
Coconut Grove (Miami)
Pan Am
City and town halls in Florida
Government of Miami
City and town halls on the National Register of Historic Places in Florida
1934 establishments in Florida